Gérard Andy is a French professional football manager who manages Phare Petit-Canal in the Guadeloupe Division of Honor. From 2006 to 2008, he managed the Saint Martin national football team.

References

Year of birth missing (living people)
Living people
French football managers
Expatriate football managers in the Collectivity of Saint Martin
Saint Martin national football team managers
Place of birth missing (living people)